David Forsyth may refer to:
David Forsyth (actor) (born 1947), American soap opera actor
David Forsyth (chess player) (1854–1909), Scottish and New Zealand chess writer and inventor of Forsyth notation
David Forsyth (computer scientist), contemporary American computer scientist
David Forsyth (soccer) (1852–1936), Canadian educator and soccer player and administrator

See also
 Forsyth (surname) for other people named Forsyth
 Forsyth (disambiguation) for other things named Forsyth